, simply known as Seiya, is a fictional character in the Saint Seiya manga series created by Masami Kurumada. He is the eponymous protagonist who makes his debut in the first chapter , published in Weekly Shōnen Jump magazine on January 1, 1986. Like most of Kurumada's characters, Seiya's design was inspired in the main character of his previous hit manga Ring ni Kakero, Ryuji Takane.

Seiya is one of the eighty-eight mythical warriors known as Saints who have served the Goddess Athena throughout the ages, protecting justice and peace on Earth. As a Saint, Seiya dons a powerful armor of divine origins known as a Cloth, the one which represents the constellation of Pegasus. Seiya also possesses superhuman strength and speed, two of the many extraordinary abilities the Saints draw from their guardian constellations and an inner essence called Cosmo. Critical reception to Seiya has been mixed. While many enjoy his character design and call of justice, many reviewers feels he is overshadowed by other characters and the way he handles his fights.

Creation and conception
While in the process of creating Saint Seiya, Masami Kurumada initially gave Seiya the name Rin, intending to title his manga . However, as he continued developing the story, he changed the name to Seiya, which he felt was more fitting. First he used the name with the Japanese characters that mean , to relate it to Seiya's condition as a Saint, but later decided to spell it as "star arrow", to emphasize the constellation and mythological motif. Finally, he changed the title of the manga to Saint Seiya, once the concept of the Saints was fully developed. Kurumada stated that one of the first ideas he had for Saint Seiya was the "Pegasus Meteor Fist". Since his manga was going to use the constellations as a very important and ever-present theme, he wanted his protagonist to have a special move that would be like a shower of meteors.

Seiya's likeness was inspired by that of Takane Ryūji, the main character of Kurumada's hit manga Ring ni Kakero created nine years before Saint Seiya and which he considers to be his favorite creation. Most protagonists in his works bear a resemblance to Ryūji because Kurumada subscribes to Osamu Tezuka's Star System (maintaining a stable cast of characters who play a different or similar role in the author's various works, sometimes with the same personality, sometimes with a different one). The same process was used to create almost all the other characters in the series, as in all of Kurumada's works. The Sagittarius Gold Cloth was chosen as the most famous of the Gold Cloths because of its symbolism in relation to the main character. The Japanese meaning of Seiya's name, "star arrow", is also a metaphor for "meteor" and Sagittarius represents an archer, so Kurumada thought it would be a perfect match for Seiya, especially since he already had in mind that Seiya would eventually wear the Sagittarius Gold Cloth in certain parts. Hence, Seiya's zodiacal sign is Sagittarius.

Casting

In the animated adaptations of the series, Seiya was voiced by several voice actors. Tōru Furuya voiced him in the 1986 anime series, all five theatrical releases, the first series of original video animations (OVA) adapting the Hades arc of the original manga released in 2004 and the 2012 anime series Saint Seiya Omega. Hiroko Emori provided additional voice acting for scenes in which Seiya appears as a child. In the later Hades arc OVAs from 2005 to 2008, Seiya was voiced by Masakazu Morita. In the uncensored English dub by ADV, he was voiced by Illich Guardiola and Cameron Bautsch, and by Tim Hamaguchi in the censored dub by DiC Entertainment. He is voiced by Bryson Baugus in the CG Knights of the Zodiac and the Netflix dub.

Furuya also said Seiya was his favorite character from all those he voiced and laughed when doing his iconic "Pegasus Meteor Fist". Morita has said that Seiya was one of his most favorite characters due to how "passionate" he is. Kaito Ishikawa mentions being happy with the work he was assigned to for Legend of Sanctuary.

Character outline

Overview
Seiya is the eponymous main character of the Saint Seiya series. He is one of the eighty-eight Saints of Athena and serves loyally at her side. Seiya draws his superhuman powers from the Cosmos, the energy of the Big Bang that lingers inside each being and which connects a Saint to his constellation and Cloth. At the start of the series, Seiya is thirteen years old. His main objective is to find his older sister, Seika, who disappeared when he was sent to Greece to train to become a Saint under the supervision of the Silver Saint Eagle Marin. Due to her physical similarities to Seika, Seiya suspects that Marin may be his sister, but he later discovers he is wrong and finds his real sister. As Seiya starts fighting alongside the other Bronze Saints, albeit reluctantly at first, his motivations shift to the protection of Athena. Seiya is a person of burning passion and spirit, sometimes acting in brash and impulsive ways. Despite this, he is still a brave, kind-hearted and selfless young man; who is always willing to sacrifice himself for justice, his friends and Athena. His most notable characteristic is his absolute determination and refusal to ever give up, even when faced with impossible odds. He also has a habit of making jokes and can be unconcerned about the consequences of his actions.

Abilities
As a Saint, Seiya has been trained in mind and body to learn how to use the power of the Cosmos within his own body and use it for super strength, speed, agility, durability and reflexes. The Pegasus Cloth armor he wears represents the Pegasus constellation, which is associated with Pegasus, the divine winged horse from Greek mythology; which protects his body even more. Seiya trained for six years and defeated ten other trainees to obtain the Pegasus Cloth and the status of Saint of Athena. The Pegasus Bronze Cloth is damaged various times throughout the series, with Aries Mu typically responsible for repairs. In the manga, the Cloth changes appearance each time it is fixed, while it remains the same in the anime adaptation until the series' second arc. After the Gold Saints use their blood to revive the Bronze Cloths at the end of the Sanctuary arc, the Pegasus Cloth takes on a golden hue whenever Seiya charges his Cosmo to the maximum. The version of the Cloth that Seiya uses in the Hades arc possesses wings that allow him to fly, both normally and through dimensions. During Seiya's fight against Thanatos, it reaches its God Cloth state, which was last seen in the ages of myth and further increases Seiya's Cosmo and vitality.

In desperate situations, Seiya occasionally wears the Gold Cloth of Sagittarius, a Cloth whose true owner, Aiolos, died thirteen years before the events of the series. The Gold Cloth magnifies Seiya's Cosmo. Despite this, although Seiya uses the Sagittarius Gold Cloth many times throughout the series to save Athena, he is never officially granted ownership of the Cloth.

Although Seiya begins his journey as a Bronze Saint, the lowest of the three ranks of Saints, his abilities gradually grow to rival those of the Gold Saints; the most powerful of Athena's soldiers. He achieves this by awakening his seventh sense, the essence and origin of the Cosmo. Before descending into the realm of Hades, he also awakens his eighth sense, known as Arayashiki, which allows him to enter the Underworld without being subject to Hades's rule.

Appearances

Saint Seiya
Seiya is a young teenager who is trained by Marin in Greece to obtain the Pegasus Cloth and return to his home, Japan. There he discovers that his sister Seika has been missing ever since Seiya was forced to train in Greece, being separated from her, his childhood friend Miho, and all the other orphans. Saori Kido negotiates with him to fight other people who became Saints to attract the media's attention and have her group search for Seika. Seiya's constant fights are interrupted by his former companion Phoenix Ikki who wants revenge for the training he went through. Although Seiya defeats Ikki with his friends' help, the Saints are attacked by higher ranked Silver Saints sent by the Sanctuary's Pope. Learning that Saori is the reincarnation of Athena, the Saints go to the Sanctuary to face the tyrant Pope and have to run through all its Twelve Temples when Saori suffers a mortal wound. Master the Cosmos known as Seventh Sense, Seiya and his friends manage to defeat the strongest Gold Saints including the Pope, who is revealed as Gemini Saga, and save Saori.

Following the battle against Saga, Seiya and his friends recover until Saori goes to confront Poseidon's reincarnation Julian Solo who wishes to flood the world and Saori tries to prevent it by giving her life in exchange. The Saints go to Poseidon's submarine temple where they fight Poseidon's Mariner Generals in order to free Saori. In the Hades arc, Seiya is sent out of the Sanctuary by an order from Athena meant to protect the Bronze Saints from the lord of the Underworld, Hades. However, after Saori's death, Seiya goes to the Underworld to deliver Athena's Cloth to her. Seiya eventually arrives in Elysion and, while fighting against the gods Hypnos and Thanatos he discovers his sister Seika is alive. After defeating Thanatos, Seiya encounters Hades. During the fight, Seiya is mortally wounded by the sword of Hades while protecting Athena and his Cosmo disappears shortly before the Saints achieve victory.

Saint Seiya: Next Dimension
Seiya's story continues in Kurumada's 2006 manga, Saint Seiya: Next Dimension (canonic sequel and prequel). Here, Seiya is shown sitting in a wheelchair. He has survived Hades's attack, but remains in an unresponsive state, suffering from Hades's curse. Seeking to save him from certain death, Athena Saori Kido, Shun Andromeda, Ikki Phoenix, Shiryu Dragon, Hyoga Cygnus travels to the past to find a way to remove Hades's sword before it can strike Seiya. Seiya is proclaimed as the future Gold Saint of the Sagittarius successor to Sagittarius Aiolos.

As Pegasus Tenma

Tenma is Seiya's incarnation in the 18th century. He appears in Masami Kurumada's Saint Seiya: Next Dimension and Shiori Teshirogi's Saint Seiya: The Lost Canvas manga. Both have in common that Tenma is a childhood friend of Alone, Hades' chosen body in that time. Tenma has the same appearance as Seiya and uses the same techniques.

In other media

In the last film takes place after the events of the Hades arc. Seiya is cursed by the sword of Hades instead of dying, while Athena and the other protagonist Bronze Saints are attacked by the gods of Olympus. In the end, Seiya manages to wound the god Apollo. The conclusion of the actual fight between the two is not depicted; instead, the climax of the movie cuts to a peaceful scene where Seiya apparently becomes reacquainted with Saori Kido. It was explained in the Japanese DVD audio commentary with director Shigeyasu Yamauchi that, since Seiya's and Saori's greatest strength was their love and trust for each other, Apollo erased their memories so that they would never again be able to find the will to rebel against the gods. Seiya also appears in a scene from Episode.G which reenacts Seiya's fight against Aiolia. In the sequel Episode.G Assassin an older Seiya appears in a parallel universe to protect Shiryu from an enemy named Sigurd. With Athena's help, Seiya reawakens his Pegasus God Cloth, giving him the power needed to defeat Sigurd.

In Saint Seiya Omega however the story branches out the Hades Chapter in a different way. Seiya is shown in several flashbacks as having recovered, and still serving Athena, as Saori Kido, as the Sagittarius Gold Saint this time, revered as a legend and a source of inspiration to whom the newest Pegasus, Kōga, looks at hoping to match his prowess and legendary deeds. Near the end of season-1, Seiya returns to help the Bronze Saints to stop the God of Darkness Abzu from manipulating Koga. He later lends Koga his Sagittarius Cloth to defeat the God. Following Abzu's defeat, Seiya is assigned by Athena the mission of killing the Goddess Pallas but fails due to his hesitation. Seiya later goes to defend the Academy Palestra and joins the Bronze and Steel Saints in their fights against Pallas' soldiers. When reaching Pallas' territory, he is in charge of bodyguarding Athena alongside the other Gold Saints until she confronts Pallas. Following Athena's victory, Seiya defeats Pallas' bodyguard Titan while he dons the evolved Sagittarius Cloth. He later fights the God of Time, Saturn, but is defeated and lends his Cosmos to Koga so that he will succeed in battle.

Reception
In Japan, Seiya is the least popular of the main characters in Saint Seiya, ranking fifth in the Bronze Saints character poll. However, in the technique poll, his Pegasus Meteor Fist ranked first. Merchandise based on Seiya has also been released, including plushes and action figures with different cloths. In a Saint Seiya Omega poll, Seiya was voted as the best character.

Several anime and manga publications have provided both acclaim and criticism of Seiya's character. DVDVerdictReview.com describes Seiya as poorly developed, wholly characterised by his affiliations and connection to a constellation. DVDVisionJapan comments on Seiya's interesting character and praises voice actors Tōru Furuya and Illich Guardiola for adding emotion and passion into his character. Anime News Network, on the other hand, comments that Seiya's voice actor for the English dub is unsuitable, that he enunciates strange words and does not sound at all heroic. They also criticized Seiya for being an "underdog" in most battles. Chris Beveridge from AnimeOnDVD found that Seiya was overshadowed by his comrades in the anime's tenth DVD but still found the other characters made the DVD appealing. In a review of the series, writer Jason Thompson notes one of Seiya's early fights against the Black Saints ends with one of the most painful scene as Seiya's blood is contaminated and later his friend Shiryu has to heal him by removing all of his blood. Additionally, Thompson noted that Seiya's speech in the series' last arc regarding how he blames gods for humanity's problems, to the point of being noted as "atheism or anti-theism" comparing him with the 2010 film Clash of the Titans. Mark Thomas of the Fandom Post criticized Seiya's overuse of his Meteor Fist as he tends to repeat in all of his fights even when his enemies manage to block it. In a review of Legend of Sanctuary, Screen praised Seiya's comical characterization as well as the performance of the Pegasus Meteor Fist technique. GamerFocus complimented the way Seiya and his friends were handled in Saint Seiya Omega as while the protagonist, Pegasus Koga, stars alongside a new group of Saints, Seiya's actions do not take the spotlight.

In "Blood, Biceps, and Beautiful Eyes: Cultural Representations of Masculinity in Masami Kurumada's Saint Seiya", author Lorna Piatti-Farnell notes that the masculinity Seiya, Shun, Hyoga and Shiryu bow to involves accomplishments of their goals of justice might not come as a surprise as the magazine Shonen Jump often has manga that involves this predicaments.

Michael Jackson regarded himself as a fan of Seiya's character. In regards to the Netflix series, HobbyConsolas warned long time fans not to expect the original violent battle between Shiryu and Seiya from the original series as a result of the demographic intended. The Daily Dot criticized the friendship Seiya develops with his friends as they form a bond despite knowing each other for only four episodes in the Netflix series.

Notes and references

Anime and manga characters who can move at superhuman speeds
Anime and manga characters with superhuman strength
Child characters in anime and manga
Comics characters introduced in 1986
Fictional archers
Fictional characters who can manipulate light
Fictional characters with air or wind abilities
Fictional characters with dimensional travel abilities
Fictional characters with energy-manipulation abilities
Fictional characters with extrasensory perception
Fictional characters with superhuman durability or invulnerability
Fictional deicides
Fictional guitarists
Fictional Japanese people in anime and manga
Fictional male martial artists
Fictional swordfighters in anime and manga
Male characters in anime and manga
Martial artist characters in anime and manga
Orphan characters in anime and manga
Pegasus in popular culture
Saint Seiya characters
Teenage characters in anime and manga